Distamycin is a polyamide-antibiotic, which acts as a minor groove binder, binding to the small furrow of the double helix.

Properties 
Distamycin is a pyrrole-amidine antibiotic and analogous to netropsin and the class of lexitropsins. As opposed to netropsin, distamycin contains three N-methyl-pyrrole units. It is harvested from Streptomyces netropsis that also produces netropsin. Distamycin prefers AT-rich DNA-sequences and tetrades of [TGGGGT]4.Distamycin inhibits the transcription and increases the activity of the topoisomerase II.
Derivates from distamycin are used as alkylating antineoplastic agents to combat tumours. Derivates with fluorophores are used as fluorescent tags for double-stranded DNA.

The compound is hygroscopic, and sensible to light, freeze and hydrolysis. Its molar attenuation coefficient is 37,000 M−1 cm−1 at a wavelength of 303 nm.

See also 
 Lexitropsin
 Netropsin
 Hoechst 33258
 DAPI

References 

Peptides
Antibiotics
DNA-binding substances
Imidazoles
Pyrroles
Amines